Norco is a census-designated place (CDP) in St. Charles Parish, Louisiana, United States. The population was 2,984 at the 2020 census. The community is home to a major Shell petroleum refinery. The CDP's name is derived from the New Orleans Refining Company.

Etymology 
The community of Norco was once called "Sellers," after a wealthy family there. In 1911, the land was purchased by an agent for Shell Oil, and the New Orleans Refining Company (NORCO) was established. The community's name was officially changed from Sellers to Norco sometime after 1926.

History
By the late 18th century, French and European colonial settlers had established numerous sugar cane plantations. They imported enslaved Africans as laborers. As sugar cane cultivation was highly labor-intensive, the slave population greatly outnumbered the ethnic Europeans in the colony, a circumstance that continued after the Louisiana Purchase by the United States in 1803.

On January 8, 1811, planters were alarmed by the German Coast Uprising led by Charles Deslondes, a free person of color from Haiti (formerly the French colony of Saint-Domingue). It was the largest slave uprising in US history, though it resulted in few white fatalities. Deslondes and his followers had been influenced by the ideas of the French and Haitian revolutions. In 1809–1810, French-speaking refugees from the Revolution immigrated by the thousands to New Orleans and Louisiana: white planters and their slaves, and free people of color, adding to the French Creole, African and free people of color populations.

Deslondes led followers to the plantation of Col. Manuel André, where they had hoped to seize stored arms, but those had been moved. The band traveled downriver, gathering more slaves for the insurrection as they marched. They were armed simply with hand tools and accompanied their progress by drums. More than 200 men participated in the uprising; they killed two white men on their march toward New Orleans. The alarm was raised, and both militia and regular troops were called out by Gov. William C.C. Claiborne to put down the short-lived revolt. The white militia and troops killed 95 slaves in total, many immediately and others in executions after quick trials.

Since 1995 members of the African American History Alliance of Louisiana have gathered annually at Norco in January to commemorate the events of the German Coast Uprising, when men of color reached for freedom decades before the American Civil War and emancipation. They have been joined by descendants of the insurgents.

In 1942, a Catholic Church, Sacred Heart of Jesus Church, was founded.

Geography
Norco is located at  (30.003753, -90.410824). The city is situated on the eastern edge of the large Bonnet Carré Spillway, which provides for an outlet from the Mississippi River to Lake Pontchartrain during flooding of the river.

There are two distinct neighborhoods in Norco, one of which is 'Diamond' that spans about four blocks and it is 100% African American and the other neighborhood in Norco is 98% white.

Demographics 

As of the 2020 United States census, there were 2,984 people, 1,201 households, and 750 families residing in the CDP.

Education
St. Charles Parish Public School System operates public schools, including:
 Norco Elementary K-3 School
 Norco Elementary 4-6 School
 Destrehan High School in Destrehan

Prior to 1969 Mary M. Bethune High School in Norco served area black students; that year it closed, with high school students moved to Destrehan High School.

Notable people
Minor Hall, jazz drummer
Tubby Hall, jazz drummer
James Brown Humphrey, Musician, bandleader, and music instructor
Damaris Johnson, NFL wide receiver/punt returner for the Philadelphia Eagles and Houston Texans
Jamall Johnson, NFL and CFL linebacker and actor
Rondell Mealey, NFL running back for the Green Bay Packers
Gregory A. Miller, member of the Louisiana House of Representatives from St. Charles Parish, was reared in Norco.
Ralph R. Miller, member of the Louisiana House from 1968 to 1980 and 1982 to 1992; father of Gregory A. Miller
George T. Oubre, state senator from 1968 to 1972 for St. Charles, St. James, and St. John the Baptist parishes; candidate for state attorney general in December 1971, while residing in Norco
Jeremy Parquet, NFL offensive lineman for the Kansas City Chiefs, St. Louis Rams and Pittsburgh Steelers
Rusty Rebowe, NFL linebacker for the New Orleans Saints
Tim Rebowe, Head football coach at Nicholls State University
Darrington Sentimore, NFL defensive lineman for the Cincinnati Bengals
Gary Smith, Jr., Louisiana state senator

In popular culture
 The eponymous video game NORCO takes place in the alternative future Norco and the surrounding area.

See also
Fenceline community
Mary M. Bethune High School
Shell plant explosion in Norco, Louisiana

References

External links

Fenceline, PBS documentary about the oil industry in Norco, and how the community is divided over issues around it.

Census-designated places in Louisiana
Census-designated places in St. Charles Parish, Louisiana
Census-designated places in New Orleans metropolitan area
Louisiana populated places on the Mississippi River